Owen (see below) is a town in the district of Esslingen in Baden-Württemberg in southern Germany.

Pronunciation
The name's pronunciation contradicts ordinary German orthographic rules and is more similar to English standard pronunciation. The name derives from the old word "Aue", meaning floodplain, and kept its ancient pronunciation.

Traffic
Owen is connected to the railway-system by the  Teckbahn (Wendlingen–Oberlenningen). The Königlich Württembergischen Staats-Eisenbahnen built the station in 1899. There are bus connections to the neighbour communities.

Through Owen leads A-Road B 465 from Kirchheim unter Teck to Blaubeuren. Highway A 8 is three miles away, junction Kirchheim-Ost.

References

Esslingen (district)
Württemberg